Cardiaspina is a bug genus in the subfamily Spondyliaspidinae.

Species 
 Cardiaspina alba
 Cardiaspina albicollaris
 Cardiaspina albitextura
 Cardiaspina artifex
 Cardiaspina bilobata
 Cardiaspina brunnea
 Cardiaspina caestata
 Cardiaspina cerea
 Cardiaspina corbula
 Cardiaspina densitexta
 Cardiaspina fiscella
 Cardiaspina jerramungae
 Cardiaspina maniformis
 Cardiaspina pinnaeformis
 Cardiaspina retator
 Cardiaspina spinifera
 Cardiaspina spinosula
 Cardiaspina squamula
 Cardiaspina tenuitela
 Cardiaspina tetragonae
 Cardiaspina tetrodontae
 Cardiaspina textrix
 Cardiaspina virgulipelta
 Cardiaspina vittaformis

References

External links 

Aphalaridae
Psylloidea genera